Our Time Press began publishing in February 1996.

Our Time Press was co-founded by David Mark Greaves and Bernice Elizabeth Green and owned by DBG Media, publishers of Our Time Press, Inc. a privately held company. The newspaper has a circulation of about 20,000 copies.

It was founded by David Greaves in 1996. He described it as, "an African-American paper. We speak from an African-American perspective, or at least try to…" The focus is on downtown Brooklyn through Fort Greene, Clinton Hill, Bed-Stuy, Crown Heights, Flatbush, and Brownsville, though the subtitle is, "The Local Paper with the Global View." It is the largest African-American owned and operated newspaper in Brooklyn.

See also
Media of New York City
African-American newspapers

References

External links
 Our Time Press

Weekly newspapers published in the United States
Newspapers published in Brooklyn
African-American newspapers
African-American newspapers published in New York (state)